The 1996 Sta. Lucia Realtors season was the fourth season of the franchise in the Philippine Basketball Association (PBA).

Draft pick

Summary
Assistant coach Adonis Tierra takes over from Nat Canson at the start of the season. The Realtors fell short of a semifinal stint in the All-Filipino Cup when they lost to Formula Shell in their last game in the eliminations on April 16 and failed to create a tie with Ginebra, which booked its first semifinal appearances in three years. 

Import Melvin Simon led Sta.Lucia to five straight wins in the Commissioners Cup. The Realtors nip Sunkist, 74-73 in the opening game on June 14.  Their second win came against San Miguel Beermen, 79-77 in Dagupan City on June 20.  Three more victories followed over Mobiline, Shell and Purefoods for their best start in franchise history.  The Realtors then lost three straight games and Simon was replaced by Eldridge Hudson. In the semifinal round, the Realtors lost two of their first three outings and Hudson was sent home and Sta.Lucia had their third reinforcement James Hodges, who scored 30 points in his debut but the Realtors still lost to importless Alaska Milkmen, 86-89 on August 11. Hodges played six games for the Realtors which placed third in the Conference. 

Sta.Lucia won their first game in the Governors Cup over Purefoods, 76-73 in overtime on October 1, playing without an import in the second half as coach Adonis Tierra benched Tyrone Grandberry midway in the second quarter for lackluster play.  Grandberry goes down in league history as one of the imports to have the shortest stint as he played for only 15 minutes and scored four points and was replaced immediately in the Realtors' next game by their resident import Lambert Shell, who is on his fourth duty with Sta.Lucia in the last four years. The Realtors were tied with Purefoods and Sunkist after the eliminations with five wins and six losses, they lost to Purefoods in a playoff for the last quarterfinals berth, 76-81 on November 17.

Notable dates
June 23: Sta.Lucia turned to import Melvin Simon for the big baskets as it bounced back from an anemic five-point second quarter to repulse Mobiline, 75-73, for their third straight squeaker win. Simon banged in 18 of his 24 points in the second half, including the decisive basket down low with 25.4 seconds left. 

June 28: Boyet Fernandez buried a triple with 43.9 seconds left while Jun Limpot nailed a follow-up shot off Fernandez missed-free throw in the final 16 seconds to lift Sta.Lucia past Shell, 93-90 in overtime, and assume the solo lead in the Commissioners Cup with its fourth straight scrambling victory. 

October 26: Boyet Fernandez scored two quick baskets in the final minute, capped by a driving layup with 3.9 seconds left that snapped the final tie as Sta.Lucia scored a pulsating 95-93 win over Sunkist Orange Bottlers at St.La Salle gym in Bacolod City. Realtors main man Jun Limpot finish with his personal-best and a season high 41 points.

Roster

Transactions

Additions

Recruited imports

References

Sta. Lucia Realtors
Sta. Lucia Realtors seasons